Tibetan Review is a Tibetan monthly journal and news website published in English, based in Delhi, India. It was first published in Darjeeling, West Bengal in April 1967 by Lodi Gyari. It is well known for its open and vibrant democratic forum for the discussion of the Tibetan problem and other related governmental and social issues on Tibet.

History 
Tibetan Review is a Tibetan journal in English published by the Tibetan. It was first published under the name The Voice of Tibet in 1967 by Lodi Gyari. In 1968, its new editor Mr Tenzing Ngawang Takla, changed its name to Tibetan Review, its official name since the January 1968 edition.

In 1971, financial difficulties forced the Tibetan Review to request the Tibetan exile government for help. The exiled Tibetan government established a new department called the Information Office, where the Tibetan Review and Sheja (Tibetan language journal) were put together in one building in Dharamshala, H.P., India.In 1972, Mr Tenzing Namgyal Tethong became its new editor and he took the responsibility with Mr Tamdin D Gyalpo, working as an executive editor. Mr Tethong edited the journal till June 1972.

Dawa Norbu in June 1972 assumed the responsibility of the Tibetan Review. Before taking its responsibilities and moving its office to 16 Jor Bagh, New Delhi, he secured guarantee from the exiled Tibetan government to have editorial independence.

Tsering Wangyal, who was known as "Editor", took the responsibility from Dawa Norbu in October 1976. For a brief interim while Mr Wangyal went to the US for an internship offered by the Alfred Friendly Press Fellowship Mr Lhasang Tsering took charge of the Tibetan Review as an Acting Editor from May-Dec 1986. In September 1996 Mr Wangyal left the institution.

Pema Thinley is the current editor of the Tibetan Review since 1996.

Tibetan Review was started as a private initiative of Lodi Gyari however, due to lack of funds it was taken under the exile Tibetan government setup in 1971.

Over the years, due to the editorially independent, it became inconsistent with the exiled Tibetan government policies which led to the subject of criticism, especially by the Tibetan parliament in exile.
In April 1999 the Tibetan Review set up Tibetan Review Trust Society and went back to non-governmental funded institution.

Monthly Journal 
The Tibetan Review is a monthly journal published in Delhi, India. The journal covers news and features about Tibet and the exiled Tibetan community. It also focuses on China and Sino-Indian relationships. It was first published in Darjeeling in 1967 by Lodi Gyari.

Online Publication 
The online publication of the Tibetan Review provides periodic updates on important Tibetan related issues on its website.

List of editor 

Lodi Gyaltsen Gyari (April 1967 - Dec1967)
 Tenzin Ngawang Takla (Dec1967 - Dec 1971)
Tenzin Namgyal Tethong (Jan 1972 - May1972)
 Dawa T. Norbu (June1972 - Sept1976)
Tsering Wangyal (Oct1976 - Aug1996)
Lhasang Tsering (Acting editor, May-Dec 1986)
 Pema Thinley (Aug 1996 - Till now)

References 

Mass media in Tibet
English-language journals
Monthly journals
Magazines established in 1967
1967 establishments in West Bengal